The 1st Mid-Cheshire MC Formula 2 Race was a Formula Two motor race held on 8 August 1953 at Oulton Park Circuit, Cheshire. The race was run over 33 laps of the circuit, and was won by British driver Tony Rolt in a Connaught Type A-Lea Francis; Rolt also setting fastest lap. Peter Whitehead in a Cooper T24-Alta was second and the Hon. Edward Greenall was third in a Cooper T18-JAP. Les Leston in a Cooper T26-JAP started from pole position but retired after 12 laps.

Results

References

Mid-Cheshire M.C. Formula 2 Race
Mid-Cheshire M.C. Formula 2 Race
Mid-Cheshire M.C. Formula 2 Race